Bob Hodges (born August 16, 1944) is a Canadian retired National Hockey League linesman.

Early life 
Hodges was born in Hespeler, Ontario, in 1944. He won two Ontario championships as a goaltender, for the Hespeler Juveniles in 1963 and the Hespeler Shamrocks in 1964.

Career 
Hodges began his officiating career in 1972 and worked until 1998. During his career (in which he wore a helmet from the late-1980s to his retirement), he had officiated three Stanley Cup finals, 1,701 regular season games, 157 playoff games, and three All-Star games. From the 1994–95 NHL season until his retirement, he wore uniform number 37.

Awards and honors 
Hodges was inducted into the Cambridge Sports Hall of Fame in 1999, Waterloo Region Hall of Fame in 2008, and Stairway of Excellence at Alexander Galt Regional High School in 2011.

Personal life 
Hodges is married to his wife Gail. They have two children.

References

External links
NHLOA.com bio
Cambridge Hall of Fame bio

1944 births
Living people
National Hockey League officials
Canadian ice hockey officials

People from Cambridge, Ontario
Ice hockey people from Ontario
Ice hockey goaltenders
Canadian ice hockey goaltenders